B-Daman Fireblast, known as Cross Fight B-Daman in Japan (クロスファイト ビーダマンeS), is the second B-Daman anime of the Crossfire series, and the seventh B-Daman anime series overall. Premiering on October 7, 2012 in Japan. The series began airing on TV Tokyo in Japan starting October 7, 2012 and ending September 29, 2013. On March 27, 2015, B-Daman Fireblast was released in North America through a new app for iPhone and iPad, with an Android device release on April 13, 2015. On the day of release, the app featured access to the first 9 episodes in English.

Episodes list

References

B-Daman
B-Daman Fireblast